The barred puffbird (Nystalus radiatus) is a species of bird in the family Bucconidae, the puffbirds, nunlets, and nunbirds. It is found in Panama, Colombia and Ecuador.

Taxonomy and systematics

In the first half of the twentieth century the barred puffbird was treated by some authors as belonging to genus Ecchaunornis, but since then was returned to genus Nystalus. It is monotypic. A proposed subspecies, "N. r. fulvidus" is probably a color morph.

Description

Its crown is blackish with dark rufous bars. The upper nape is black, the lower nape yellowish red, and the upper mantle black. The rest of the upperparts and the wings are dark chestnut with narrow black bands. The tail is long, narrow, and chestnut with narrow black bands. The chin is whitish. The face and underparts are pale rufous with fine blackish bars except in the center of the belly. The bill is grayish yellow to blackish, the eye creamy yellow, and the feet greenish gray. The "fulvidus" morph is a deeper rufous overall.

Distribution and habitat

The barred puffbird is resident from central Panama into northern Colombia and through western Colombia into western Ecuador. It inhabits the lower levels of several semi-open landscapes including the borders of humid and wet forest, streamside vegetation, clearings with scattered trees, and the edges of forest trails. In Ecuador it has regularly been recorded perched on wires in agricultural areas.

Behavior

Feeding

The barred puffbird's foraging behavior has not been documented; other puffbirds typically hunt by sallying from a perch. Its diet includes large insects of several orders and small lizards.

Breeding

The only described nest of a barred puffbird was a cup of dead leaves. It was in a spherical chamber at the end of a narrow tunnel excavated in a clay bank and partially shaded by vegetation. It contained two well-grown nestlings.

Vocalization

The barred puffbird's song is "a long, slow, ventriloquial and very human-like wolf-whistle, 'phweeeeeet-weeeeeeuuuu'". Near the nest it made low-pitched "werr" and "werr werr woo" calls.

Status

The IUCN has assessed the barred puffbird as being of Least Concern. Its population is estimated at at least 50,000 mature individuals but is believed to be decreasing. It occurs in several protected areas in Colombia and Ecuador.

References

barred puffbird
Birds of the Tumbes-Chocó-Magdalena
barred puffbird
barred puffbird
Taxonomy articles created by Polbot